Gåte EP is the name of two self-titled EPs released by the Norwegian band Gåte

Gåte EP (2000)
Gåte EP is the first self-titled EP, and was released in the year 2000.

Track listing
"Byssanlull"
"Litlefuglen"
"Solbønn"
"Grusomme skjebne"
"Eg veit i himmelrik ein borg"

Gåte EP (2002)
Gåte EP is the second self-titled EP, and was released in the year 2002.

Track listing
"Grusomme skjebne"
"Følgje"
"Liti Kjersti"
"Storås"

Charts

References

2000 EPs
2002 EPs
Gåte albums